Margaret E. Bean (born 18 June 1953) is a track and road cyclist from Guam. She represented her nation at the 1992 Summer Olympics on the road in the women's road race and on the track in the women's individual pursuit.

References

External links
 
 profile at sports-reference.com

Guamanian women
Guamanian female cyclists
Cyclists at the 1992 Summer Olympics
Olympic cyclists of Guam
Living people
Place of birth missing (living people)
1953 births
21st-century American women